Callia pulchra is a species of beetle in the family Cerambycidae. It was described by Melzer in 1930. It is known from Brazil, Bolivia, Argentina and Paraguay.

References

Calliini
Beetles described in 1930